Dominique Mayho (born 29 November 1993 in Hamilton) is a Bermudian cyclist, who most recently rode for American amateur team Landis Trek Team.

Major results

2012
 National Road Championships
1st Road race
1st Time trial
2013
 1st Road race, National Road Championships
2015
 1st  Criterium, Island Games
 1st Road race, National Road Championships
2016
 1st Road race, National Road Championships
2017
 National Road Championships
1st Road race
1st Time trial
2018
 National Road Championships
1st Road race
2nd Time trial
2019
 1st Road race, National Road Championships
2021
 1st Road race, National Road Championships

References

External links

1993 births
Living people
Bermudian male cyclists
Cyclists at the 2014 Commonwealth Games
Cyclists at the 2015 Pan American Games